Reinhard van Zyl (born 4 February 1994) is a South African male javelin thrower, who won an individual gold medal at the Youth World Championships.

References

External links

1994 births
Living people
South African male javelin throwers